Richard Erdoes (Hungarian Erdős, German Erdös; July 7, 1912 – July 16, 2008) was an American artist, photographer, illustrator and author.

Early life
Erdoes was born in Frankfurt, to Maria Josefa Schrom on July 7, 1912. His father, Richárd Erdős Sr., was a Jewish Hungarian opera singer who had died a few weeks earlier in Budapest on June 9, 1912. After his birth, his mother lived with her sister, the Viennese actress Leopoldine ("Poldi") Sangora, He described himself as "equal parts Austrian, Hungarian and German, as well as equal parts Catholic, Protestant and Jew..."

Career
He was a student at the Berlin Academy of Art in 1933, when Adolf Hitler came to power. He was involved in a small underground paper where he published anti-Hitler political cartoons which attracted the attention of the Nazi regime. He fled Germany with a price on his head. Back in Vienna, he continued his training at the Kunstgewerbeschule, now the University of Applied Arts, Vienna. He also wrote and illustrated children's books and worked as a caricaturist for Tag and Stunde, anti-Nazi newspapers. After the Anschluss of Austria in 1938 he fled again, first to Paris, where he studied at the Academie de la Grande Chaumiere, and then London, England before journeying to the United States. He married his first wife, fellow artist Elsie Schulhof (d. xxxx) in London, shortly before their arrival in New York City.

In New York City, Erdoes enjoyed a long career as a commercial artist, and was known for his highly detailed, whimsical drawings.  He created illustrations for such magazines as Stage, Fortune, Pageant, Gourmet, Harper's Bazaar, Sports Illustrated, The New York Times, Time, National Geographic and Life Magazine, where he met his second wife, Jean Sternbergh (d. 1995) who was an art director there. The couple married in 1951 and had three children.  Erdoes also illustrated many children's books.

An assignment for Life in 1967 took Erdoes to the Pine Ridge Indian Reservation for the first time, and marked the beginning of the work for which he would be best known. Erdoes was fascinated by Native American culture, outraged at the conditions on the reservation and deeply moved by the Civil Rights Movement that was raging at the time. He wrote histories, collections of Native American stories and myths, and wrote about such voices of the Native American Renaissance as Leonard and Mary Crow Dog and John Fire Lame Deer. The Erdoes' New York City apartment was a well known hub of the American Indian Movement (AIM) in the early 1970s and he became involved in the legal defense of several AIM members. In 1975 the family moved to Santa Fe, New Mexico where Erdoes continued to write and remained active in the movement for Native American civil rights.

His papers are preserved at the Beinecke Rare Book and Manuscript Library at Yale University.

Works

As author:
 Musicians Around the World (xxxx)
 Peddlers and Vendors Around the World (1967)
 Policeman Around the World (xxxx)
 The Sun Dance People: The Plains Indians Their Past and Present (1972), by Richard Erdoes 
 The Rain Dance People: The Pueblo Indians, Their Past and Present (1976)
 Sound of Flutes (1976)
 Woman Who Dared (1978)
 Native Americans: The Navajos (1979)
 Native Americans (1982)
 Native Americans: The Pueblos (1983)
 The Richard Erdoes Illustrated Treasury of Classic Unlaundered Limericks (1984)
 Crying for a Dream: The World through Native American Eyes (1990)
 Tales from the American Frontier (1992)
 A.D. 1000: Living on the Brink of Apocalypse (1994)
 Saloons of the Old West (1997)
 Legends and Tales of the American West (1998)

As illustrator:

 The Cat and The Devil (1964) by James Joyce
 Come over to My House (1966) by Theo. LeSieg (pen name of Theo Geisel aka Dr. Seuss)
 The Spotted Stones (1978) by Silvio Bedini

As editor, collector or collaborator:

 Lame Deer, Seeker of Visions (1972), together with John Fire Lame Deer
 American Indian Myths and Legends (1984), with Alfonso Ortiz (9780394507965) Book (9781564310293) Audiocassette
 Lakota Woman (1991) by Mary Crow Dog
 
 American Indian Trickster Tales (1999), with Alfonso Ortiz
 Ojibwa Warrior: Dennis Banks and the Rise of the American Indian Movement (2005), with  Dennis Banks
 Ohitika Woman (2009), with Mary Brave Bird

Honors and awards

American Institute of Graphic Arts
Viennese Museum of Applied Arts
Art Directors Club of New York
Society of Illustrators
American Book Award, Before Columbus Foundation (1991) - for Lakota Woman
Austrian Cross of Honour for Science and Art (1999)

References

External links 

 Richard Erdoes Papers. Yale Collection of Western Americana, Beinecke Rare Book and Manuscript Library.

1912 births
2008 deaths
American book editors
20th-century American historians
American male non-fiction writers
German expatriates in Austria
American children's book illustrators
Jewish American artists
German emigrants to the United States
Recipients of the Austrian Cross of Honour for Science and Art
Writers from New York City
Prussian Academy of Arts alumni
Historians from New York (state)
20th-century American male writers
20th-century American Jews
21st-century American Jews